The West Coast is a region of New Zealand on the west coast of the South Island that is administered by the West Coast Regional Council, and is known co-officially as Te Tai Poutini. It comprises the territorial authorities of Buller District, Grey District and Westland District. The principal towns are Westport, Greymouth and Hokitika. The region, one of the more remote areas of the country, is also the most sparsely populated. With a population of just 32,000 people, Te Tai Poutini is the least populous region in New Zealand, and it is the only region where the population is declining.

The region has a rich and important history. The land itself is ancient, stretching back to the Carboniferous period; this is evident by the amount of carboniferous materials naturally found there, especially coal. First settled by Kāi Tahu in approximately 1200 CE, the area was famous across New Zealand for its richness in pounamu greenstone. Kāi Tahu traded millions of modern New Zealand dollars' worth of the stone across Aotearoa, making Te Tai Poutini one of the wealthiest regions in the country.

After the arrival of Europeans, the region became famed for its vast and mostly untapped gold reserves, which historically had not been highly valued. The region was subsequently settled by thousands of Irish Catholics after the Irish Famine, who constitute the majority of the population, alongside the indigenous Kāi Tahu and those who come from admixing between the two populations. The region was also heavily sought after by nuclear weapons states in the 1950s for its abundant resources of uranium, which many West Coasters found objectionable. The West Coast / Te Tai Poutini is virtually the only region of New Zealand where coal mining is still widely practiced.

Naming
The name Westland is used by some New Zealanders to refer to the whole of the West Coast, including Grey District, Buller District and Fiordland, and can also refer to the short-lived Westland Province of 1873–76.

Fiordland is on the west coast, but is in the Southland Region rather than the West Coast Region.

Inhabitants of the West Coast are colloquially known as "Coasters".

Geography

The region reaches from Kahurangi Point in the north to Awarua Point in the south, a distance of 600 km. It has an area of 23,276 km2. To the west is the Tasman Sea (which like the Southern Ocean can be very rough, with four-metre swells common), and to the east are the Southern Alps. Much of the land is rugged, with a coastal plain where much of the population resides. It is divided into the three local government districts of (from north to south) Buller, Grey and Westland.

The land is very scenic, with wild coastlines, mountains and a very high proportion of native bush, much of it native temperate rain forest. It is the only part of New Zealand where significant tracts of lowland forest remain: elsewhere, for instance on the Canterbury Plains and in the Firth of Thames, they have been almost completely destroyed for settlement and agriculture.

Scenic areas include the Haast Pass, Fox and Franz Josef Glaciers, Hokitika Gorge, Lake Brunner, the Pancake Rocks at Punakaiki, the Oparara Arches and the Heaphy Track.

The region has very high rainfall due to the prevailing northwesterly wind pattern and the location of the Southern Alps, which give rise to heavy orographic precipitation. The rain shadow effect is responsible for the relatively arid climate of the Canterbury Plains on the other side of the Southern Alps.

History

The region is home to Ngāi Tahu, who value it for the greenstone (pounamu) found there in abundance.

The region was only occasionally visited by Europeans until the discovery of gold near the Taramakau River in 1864 by two Māori, Ihaia Tainui and Haimona Taukau.  By the end of the year there were an estimated 1800 prospectors, many of them around the Hokitika area, which in 1866 was briefly the most populous settlement in New Zealand.

The region was divided between Nelson Province and Canterbury Province from 1853: in 1873 the Canterbury portion of the region formed its own province, the Westland Province, until the abolition of the provincial system in 1876.

The West Coast Gold Rush between 1864 and 1867 created numerous gold rush towns such as Okarito, which at one time was the largest town on the West Coast but quickly almost vanished as miners moved on. After that time, the population dwindled, but the main towns that still exist had become established.

Following greenstone and gold, the next valuable mineral was coal. Discovered near the Buller River in the mid-1840s, mining began in earnest during the 1860s. By the 1880s coal had become the region's main industry, with mines throughout the northern half of the region, especially around Westport. Many of these continued in operation until the mid-20th century, and several survive.

Timber has also long been a major industry, although in recent years there has been an uneasy balance between forestry for wood and forestry for conservation. Much of the region is public land administered by the Department of Conservation and the region has some of the best remaining stands of native forest, along with a wealth of rare wildlife. Ecotourism is now an important industry, and this goes hand in hand with the conservation efforts.

Population

It is the least populous of New Zealand's sixteen regions. The West Coast is also the most sparsely populated region, with just  people per square kilometre ( per square mile).

West Coast Region had a population of 31,575 at the 2018 New Zealand census, a decrease of 573 people (−1.8%) since the 2013 census, and an increase of 249 people (0.8%) since the 2006 census. There were 13,503 households. There were 16,041 males and 15,534 females, giving a sex ratio of 1.03 males per female. The median age was 45.7 years (compared with 37.4 years nationally), with 5,604 people (17.7%) aged under 15 years, 4,920 (15.6%) aged 15 to 29, 14,853 (47.0%) aged 30 to 64, and 6,204 (19.6%) aged 65 or older.

Ethnicities were 90.5% European/Pākehā, 11.7% Māori, 1.5% Pacific peoples, 3.4% Asian, and 2.4% other ethnicities (totals add to more than 100% since people could identify with multiple ethnicities).

The proportion of people born overseas was 12.0%, compared with 27.1% nationally.

Although some people objected to giving their religion, 53.2% had no religion, 35.1% were Christian, 0.6% were Hindu, 0.2% were Muslim, 0.3% were Buddhist and 2.0% had other religions.

Of those at least 15 years old, 2,934 (11.3%) people had a bachelor or higher degree, and 7,026 (27.1%) people had no formal qualifications. The median income was $26,400, compared with $31,800 nationally. 3,078 people (11.9%) earned over $70,000 compared to 17.2% nationally. The employment status of those at least 15 was that 12,501 (48.1%) people were employed full-time, 4,083 (15.7%) were part-time, and 822 (3.2%) were unemployed.

Cities and towns 

There are only four towns with a population over 1,000: Greymouth, Westport, Hokitika and Runanga. These four towns, plus Reefton (population ), are recognised as urban areas by Statistics New Zealand.

During the gold rush days, Hokitika had a population of more than 25,000 with more than 100 pubs. A recreation of an early New Zealand settlement is at Shantytown.

Other towns and settlements include:

 Ahaura
 Blackball
 Carters Beach 
 Dobson
 Fox Glacier
 Franz Josef
 Gloriavale
 Granity
 Haast
 Hari Hari
 Kaniere
 Karamea
 Kumara
 Ngakawau
 Ross
 Waimangaroa

Economy 
The subnational gross domestic product (GDP) of the West Coast was estimated at NZ$1.86 billion in the year to March 2019, 0.6% of New Zealand's national GDP. The regional GDP per capita was estimated at $57,101 in the same period.

Industries include mining for coal and alluvial gold, forestry and wood processing, fishing (including whitebaiting), tourism and farming.

Dairy farming has grown strongly – the local dairy co-operative Westland Milk Products remained independent when most others merged to form Fonterra in 2001. In the 2019–2020 season, there were 150,000 milking cows on the West Coast, 3.0% of the country's total herd. The cows produced 50,700 tonnes of milk solids, worth $365 million at the national average farmgate price ($7.20 per kg).

Other industries are the manufacturing and sales of greenstone jewellery, sphagnum moss gathering and stone-collection for garden landscaping. Monteith's brewery is in Greymouth. The region had one of the strongest growing regional economies of New Zealand in 2007, though from a rather small base.

The region has been included in the "Top 10 Coastal Drives of the World" by Lonely Planet.

Flora and fauna 
The region has the only New Zealand nesting place of the kotuku (white heron), near Okarito Lagoon, visited by tours from the small farming township of Whataroa. This rare bird appears on the $2 coin.

Over 80% of West Coast land is administered by the Department of Conservation, much of this being in National Parks.  These include from north to south, parts of Kahurangi NP, Paparoa NP, parts of Arthurs Pass NP, Westland NP, parts of Aspiring NP plus the South Westland World Heritage Area.  Each of these parks have flora and fauna common to all areas, as well as species, like kiwi, particular to those areas.

Transport 
State Highway 6 is the main highway running the length of the region, connecting the region to the Tasman region in the north and the Otago region in the south via Haast Pass. State Highway 7 and State Highway 73 connect the West Coast with the Canterbury region via Lewis Pass and Arthur's Pass respectively.

Flights and train journeys into the region
 Flights operate daily with Air New Zealand between Christchurch and Hokitika.
 Flights operate daily with Sounds Air between Wellington and Westport.
 The TranzAlpine runs return between Christchurch and Greymouth on a daily basis.

See also
Public transport in New Zealand
Water pollution in the West Coast, New Zealand

References

External links

 West Coast Regional Council
 West Coast New Zealand
 Development West Coast
 Map (1900s) of West Coast
 
 West Coast Marine Protection Forum